Starzyński Dwór  is a village in the administrative district of Gmina Puck, within Puck County, Pomeranian Voivodeship, in northern Poland.

At a road junction in the village is a statue whose inscription describes it as a 'Monument to the martyred soldiers of the Red Army'.

It used to have a railway station on the now-dismantled Swarzewo to Krokowa branch line.

For details of the history of the region, see History of Pomerania.

The village has a population of 347.

References

Villages in Puck County